The Claud A. Jones Award is a prestigious award presented annually to the "Fleet Engineer of the Year" by the American Society of Naval Engineers (ASNE) since 1987. The award recognizes the efforts of United States fleet or field engineers who have made significant contributions to improving operational engineering or material readiness of the United States maritime forces during the past three years prior to nomination.

The award is named in memory of Medal of Honor recipient Admiral Claud Ashton Jones for "extraordinary heroism in the line of his profession" as a result of his courageous actions in 1916 while serving as engineer on  when she was wrecked in the harbor of Santo Domingo by an unexpected storm surge that originated from Hurricane Eight of the 1916 Atlantic hurricane season. Jones' career spanned over 40 years including his midshipman days with the first 24 years of his service spent largely on ships and with the fleet while serving with distinction in engineering assignments.

Criterion
The ASNE criterion for nomination states: "The nominee must have made sustained significant contributions to improving operational engineering or material readiness of maritime defense forces culminating in the three-year period ending in the current year. Evidence of the personal involvement and an assessment of the significance of the nominee's contribution should be submitted. If, for security reasons, the details of the actions cannot be publicly disclosed, the statement should be sufficiently specific for recognition of the accomplishment by those qualified to assess it and should be endorsed by a select number of experienced senior executives with authorized access to the information."

Past Recipients of the Claud A. Jones Award
Source: American Society of Naval Engineers
1987 - Commander Carl N. Strawbridge, USN - Repair of 
1988 - Captain Richard T. Holmes, USN - Engineer Officer,   
1989 - Commander Reginald J. Erman, USN - Repair Officer, 
1990 - Commander Ray S. McCord, USN - Repair Officer, 
1991 - Commander James M. Hunn, USN - Battle Damage Repair
1992 - Mr. Thomas G. Connors - Military Sealift Command Fleet
1993 - Captain Richard H. Funke, USN - Director, Engineering Training Group - Atlantic
1994 - Commander David C. Neily, USN - CO, Shore Intermediate Maintenance Activity, Guantanamo Bay
1995 - Commander Kurt J. Harris, USN - OIC of the SIXTH Fleet Ship Repair Unit Detachment, Bahrain
1996 - Commander Kevin M. McCoy, USN - While serving as Repair Officer on board 
1997 - Mr. Jon C. Leverette (Tie) -  Development of T-45 Integrated Maintenance Program (IMP)
1997 - Commander Kenneth P. Roey, USN (Tie) - While serving as Repair Officer at SIMA, San Diego
1998 - Commander David W. Bella, USN - OIC USN Ship Repair Facility, Detachment Sasebo
1999 - Commander Robert G. Butler, Jr., USN - Commanding Officer, SIMA Norfolk
2000 - Commander Patrick J. Keenan, USN - Officer in Charge, Ship Repair Unit, Bahrain
2001 - Commander Kevin M. O'Day, USCG - Cutter Support Branch Chief, Maintenance and Logistics Command, Pacific
2002 - Captain (Sel.) James G. Green, USN - Engineer Officer, USS Constellation (CV 64) and Repair Officer, SUPSHIP San Diego
2003 - Lieutenant James A. Novotny, USCG - While serving in the Naval Engineering Division at Coast Guard Headquarters, and as Assistant Section Chief for Patrol and Standard Boats at Maintenance and Logistics Command, Atlantic
2006 - Lieutenant Commander Michael J. Paradise, USCG - Project Officer for the Coast Guard's 210 foot and 270 foot Medium Endurance Cutter (WMEC) Mission Effectiveness Project (MEP)
2007 - Lieutenant Commander Roberto M. Abubo, USN - Chief Engineer, 
2008 - Master Chief Machinery Technician Bradley G. McMinn, USCG - Outstanding achievements and contributions to improving the operational readiness of the Coast Guard Cutter Fleet while assigned to Maintenance and Logistics Commands Atlantic and Pacific, Advanced Ship System Instruction and Support Teams
2009 - CDR Bradford Paul Bittle, USN
2010 - LCDR Gregory Rothrock, USCG
2011 - Mr. Larry A. Wilkerson
2012 - Mr. Scott C. Ramalho
2013 - CW04 Gregory Collins, USN
2014 - LT Caitlin R. Clemons, USCG
2015 - LCDR Jeffrey Payne, USCG
2016 - LCDR Dennis L. Richardson, USN
2017 - Mr. Joseph D. Peterson
2018 - Mr. Daniel Norton
2019 - Mr. Duane Roof

See also

 List of engineering awards

References

Marine engineering awards
History of the United States Navy
History of the United States Coast Guard
Awards established in 1987
American awards